Volkan is a given name. Notable people with the name include:

Given name
Volkan Altın (born 1986), Turkish professional footballer who currently plays as a defensive midfielder
Volkan Arslan, (born 1978), Turkish football player in midfield position
Volkan Babacan (born 1988), Turkish football player
Volkan Bekçi (born 1987), Turkish footballer
Volkan Kürşat Bekiroğlu (born 1977), Turkish footballer
Volkan Canalioğlu (born 1950), Turkish politician who served as mayor of Trabzon from 2004 to 2009
Volkan Demirel (born 1981), Turkish footballer and currently is a member of the Fenerbahçe squad
Volkan Dikmen (born 1991), Turkish footballer
Volkan Ş. Ediger (born 1953), scientist, writer, bureaucrat
Volkan Gucer, music composer, producer, performer of dilli kaval (Turkish wooden flutes)
Volkan Güç (born 1980), Turkish volleyballer
Volkan Kahraman (born 1979), Austrian football player of Turkish descent
Volkan Konak, Turkish folk singer
Volkan Şen (born 1987), Turkish footballer
Volkan Ünlü (born 1983), Turkish football goalkeeper
Volkan Yaman (born 1982), German born Turkish professional football player

 Middle name
Hilmi Volkan Demir, Turkish scientist, best known for his works on White Light Generation

Surname
Vamık Volkan (born 1932), emeritus professor of psychiatry at the University of Virginia School of Medicine

Media
Volkan (newspaper), an Ottoman daily published in period 1908–1909

Politics
VOLKAN, Turkish-Cypriot nationalist group

Turkish-language surnames
Turkish masculine given names